Stob is a village in southwest Bulgaria, administratively part of Kocherinovo Municipality, Kyustendil Province. Located at the foot of the Rila mountains and not far from the Rila Monastery, Stob was first mentioned in the 7th century and has been in continuous or near-continuous existence since then. Stob is notable for the Stob Earth Pyramids, a natural rock phenomenon in the vicinity of the village.

History and etymology
The village's name first appears in sources in a 7th-century Medieval Greek text as Στοβων (Stovon). It was also mentioned in a charter of Byzantine Emperor Basil II from 1019 after the conquest of the First Bulgarian Empire. The first reference in Old Bulgarian dates to 1378, when it appears in the Rila Charter of Bulgarian Emperor Ivan Shishman as the "town of Stob" (ГРАДЪ СТѠБЪ). The charter emphasizes the Rila Monastery's independence from nearby Stob, among other privileges, and notes that the monastery's lands and properties bordered the town.

A hagiography of Saint John of Rila from the 15th century refers to the village uniquely as Stog (СТОГЬ). However, a chronicle of Serbian monarchs from the 15th–16th century reiterates the name Stob, as does an Ottoman source from 1570. An Ottoman document from 1576 spells the name as Istob and Istub.

The name Stob is thought to derive from the Proto-Indo-European root *sto-bh-:*stei- ("to stand"), as retained in the Bulgarian word стобор stobor ("fence") and akin to words meaning "pole, pillar" in other Slavic languages (cf. Bulgarian стълб stalb). The etymology may reflect the features of the surrounding terrain. The erroneous listing Stog is possibly explained by a false etymology linking the name to the presumably more popular term стог stog ("haystack"), from the related Proto-Indo-European *stogh-.

Geography

Stob lies between the small towns of Rila and Kocherinovo at the foot of the highest mountains in Bulgaria, the Rila mountains, and is crossed by the Rilska River.

At the northeast end of Stob is the village's Eastern Orthodox church, the Church of Saint Procopius. Stob's church is reportedly the only church in Bulgaria dedicated to this saint. The village's feast day is 17 July.

Stob Earth Pyramids

The pyramids have been under state protection since 1964 as a protected site encompassing . They vary in shape from sharp through conical to mushroomlike. Some of the columns are topped by flat stones. Groups of individual pyramids have been named the Towers, the Pinnacles and the Samodiva Chimneys.

According to a popular local legend, the pyramids are in fact wedding guests who were petrified because the bride was so beautiful that the best man attempted to kiss her. Based on the legend, the local population has identified some of the pyramids as the best man, the groom, the bride and other attendants of the wedding ceremony.

References

Villages in Kyustendil Province